Lee Won-kuk (Hanja: 李元國) (April 13, 1907 – February 2, 2003) was a South Korean martial artist, who founded Chung Do Kwan. 
He introduced karate to Korea in 1944, creating his own style known as Tang Soo Do Chung Do Kwan style, which became Taekwondo as of 1955; instilling a profound influence in this martial art through teaching future masters and authoring the book “Tae Kwon Do handbook“ in 1968.

Early life and education
Lee Won-kuk was born on April 13, 1907 in Hanseong (now Seoul, the capital of South Korea), which was occupied by Japan and whose regimen regulated all of the population’s activities in the peninsula.  It prohibited the practice or teachings of any martial arts, so those interested, had to go outside of Korea (either China or Japan) to learn the arts.  Lee was interested in martial arts at a very early age, and he used to get together with the elders in his natal Seoul to listen to the old stories that narrated the practice of millennial Korean martial arts like the Taekkyeon.

It was a custom for very affluent Korean families to send their children to study in Japan, where they would learn the Japanese language and obtain the best education possible, and get to know the right contacts and improve their chances of success in a Japanese dominated society. In 1926 Lee travelled to Tokyo, where he attended high school and later attended the Chuo University specializing in Law.  During his school years, he started training in the martial arts currently known as Karate-Do Shotokan style, under the tutelage of Gichin Funakoshi and his son, Gigō Funakoshi, who was the instructor in charge of the karate club of the Chuo University of Tokyo.  It was there that Won-kuk became one of the first students of karate in Japan, obtaining the highest rank for a person who was not a Japanese national.  After his graduation in Chuo University, he travelled Japan, visiting Okinawa and many other cities in China, including centers where Chuan Fa (kung-fu) was taught.

Career

Return to Korea
Soon enough, Lee understood the meaning of his karate teachings and saw how the history and legacy of the original Korean martial arts were erased slowly from his own culture; so he decided to return to Korea wishing to teach Karate in his homeland.  This return was easily done by using his connections with high ranking Japanese officials, who allowed him to gain employment at the ministry of transportation.
In 1944, Won-kuk made an official request to the Japanese Governor in Korea and army general, Nobuyuki Abe, to teach karate classes to Japanese citizens residing in Korea and later on, to a select group of Korean citizens.  The permit was denied two times and was finally given after a third petition. Lee started teaching Tang Soo Do (the Korean translation for Karate-Do, which literally means “way of the Chinese hand”) at the Yung Shin school gym, located in Okchun-dong, Seodaemun District in Seoul. He named his school “Chung Do Kwan”, which can be translated as the school of the Blue Wave.

With the arrival of the independence of Korea (August 15, 1945), a wave of political and social unrest followed causing Lee to move his school to the Sichungyo church located in the Kyunji-dong in Seoul. Using his own resources, he continued to teach the art of Tang Soo Do independently. After one year of dedicated effort, he was able to demonstrate the efficacy of Tang Soo Do training to the new government. Soon thereafter, he obtained the support of public institutions and began teaching at the Korean police general headquarters, universities in Seoul, and the army.

During that time, the Tang Soo Do training of the Chung Do Kwan reflected the training that Lee had received from the Funakochis years before.  The Chung Do Kwan emphasized the training of basic movements, forms (Korean: Hyung; Japanese: Kata), 3-step and 1-step sparring, and working with the makiwara.  It did not take long for the Chung Do Kwan to gain popularity and for Lee’s teaching to get the entire nation’s attention. In 1947, President Syngman Rhee asked for all school members to join the government party, offering Won-kuk the position of Minister of Internal Affairs.  Lee declined the offer and as a result was incarcerated under suspicion of being the leader of a band of assassins. According to Lee, the other advanced members of the Chung Do Kwan were also persecuted and tortured.  Other sources claim Won-kuk was incarcerated for supporting the colonialist Japanese regime. He was freed in 1950 and immigrated to Japan that same year.

From Tang Soo Do to Tae Kwon Do

Lee was one of the first Koreans to study karate in Japan. This became common practice as many of the early Korean Taekwondo masters learned Karate while studying in Japanese universities or belonging to the Imperial Army of Japan, and later returned to Korea with a first or second-degree black belt.  Many schools were founded at the end of the 1940s and the beginning of the 1950s, and referred to the martial art “Korean Karate.”

Lee called his art Tang Soo Do (the “way of the Chinese hand”), which was the Korean pronunciation of the Japanese words “Karate-Do” during the decade of 1920, using the Chinese character TANG (唐). All of the original Tang Soo Do schools taught the original Okinawa-Japanese Kata, dressed in the traditional kimono and taught karate with little influence from the millenary Taekyon martial arts.  The peak of the Tang Soo Do Chung Do Kwan started the opening of new schools, ran by direct Won-kuk students or by their technical support and his promotional impulses. That’s how other Kuk Lee’s students established their own schools. Nam Tae-Hi Under the direction of Choi Hong-hi (Ohdokwan), Lee Yong-woo (Jungdokwan), Ko Jae-chun (Chungryongkwan), Kang Suh-chang (Kukmookwan) schools were created and developed.
The Taekwondo is one of the youngest oriental martial arts, and its story started with the opening of the Chung Do Kwan in Seoul in 1944.

Chung Do Kwan
The term "Chung Do Kwan" can be translated as “the School of the Blue Wave”. Won-kuk explained how he came up with that name:

The first master of the Chung Do Kwan was his founder, Lee Won-kuk (1944-1950, he renounced to his position). He was followed by Duk Sung Son (1950-1959) who was left in charge directly by Lee Won-kuk, and who left the position due to differences with the school high rank members.  After Duk Sung Son, General Choi Hong-hi (1959) acted as temporary school master, Woon Kyu-uhm (1959–present )named by a committee of high rank members of the Chung Do Kwan School.

During its first years, the attack and blocking techniques taught by the Chung Do Kwan School consisted of ten hand techniques and eight kicking techniques done to the body’s vital points.  The hand techniques were: fist punch, spear hand attack, knife hand attack, ridge hand attack (done with the inside edge of the hand, created by the thumb and the index finger), attack with two fingers to the eyes, attack with one finger, reversed fist punch and tiger hand. The kicking techniques consisted of front kick, side kick, crescent kick, and back kick to different body levels. The school kept two trends with characteristics and training philosophies completely different from each other.

The branch of the school ran by Woon Kyu-uhm headquartered in Seoul, and whose associates are affiliated to the World Taekwondo Federation and ruled by the Kukkiwon lineaments, is what is known as Olympic Tae Kwon Do today.  The Chung Do Kwan School in Korea functions as a social club, not necessarily offering official tournaments or other activities on its own.

A second branch of the school that is less known is the one developed by Duk Sung-son, who followed his teachings independently in an orthodox or traditional way; without the influence of belonging to a federated sport association and keeping the same training system, forms, uniforms and philosophies taught originally by Lee Won-kuk. This school was developed mostly in the United States, in Venezuela and Australia.

Black Belts promoted by the Chung Do Kwan in its beginnings
First generation promoted by Lee Won-kuk ( 1944-1950)

 Duk Sung-son (Founder of the World Tae Kwon do Association in NY, USA - independent)
 Suh Chong-kang (Founder of the KuK Mu Kwan - aligned with the International Taekwon-Do Federation ) Lee Won-kuk awards him the 10th degree black belt during the decade of 2000.
 HYUN Jong-myun (Co-founder of the Oh-Do kwan and the ITF)
 UHM Woon-kyu (Co-founder of the World Taekwondo Federation and actual president of the Chung Do Kwan in Korea)
 Young Taek-chung (Aligned with the World Tae kwon Do Association, of which he was vice president). In 1984 Lee Won-kuk awards him the 9th degree black belt in Kansas City, Missouri - USA.
 LEE Yong-woo(Founder of the Jung Do Kwan aligned with the World Taekwondo Federation )

Second generation black belts, promoted by Duk Sung Son (1951-1959)

 Choi Hong Hi (Founder of the Oh Do Kwan and the International Taekwon-Do Federation, honorary 4th dan awarded in 1952; he was also named honorary chief of the school)
 Nam Tae-hi(Co-founder of the Oh-Do kwan and the ITF)
 BAEK Joon-ki (Co-founder of the Oh-Do kwan and the ITF)
 KO Jae-chun (Co-founder of the Oh-Do kwan and the ITF)
 KWAK Kuen-sik(Co-founder of the Oh-Do kwan and the ITF)
 KIM Suk-kyu(Co-founder of the Oh-Do kwan and the ITF)
 HAN Cha-kyo(Co-founder of the Oh-Do kwan and the ITF)
 MIN Woon-sik
 HAN In-sook

Masters that were influenced technically and philosophically by Lee Won-kuk

 Yoon Byung-in (YMCA Kwon Bop Club)
 Hwang Kee (Moo Duk Kwan)

Legacy

During the highest peak of the Chung Do Kwan, it gathered more than 50,000 participants. During the decade of 1940 and beginning of the 50s, its trainings and teachings were considered the best and the most authentic.  Actually, it is estimated that Tae Kwon Do students exceed 70,000,000 around the world.

A great number of schools that followed the Chun Do Kwan were influenced somehow by the effort of the pioneer of the modern Korean martial arts. In 1951, Lee retired from teaching and left the leadership of the school to Duk Sung-son. In the following years, he would visit his old students, who were recognized later as “Masters,” and acted as judge in tournaments, belt test promotions and other events.  He always criticized the changes that were made to the martial art and those who valued the sport aspect of it and put aside the philosophical bases of the style.

Personal life
In 1976 Lee immigrated to the U.S. with his wife and settles in Arlington, Virginia, living in the Washington, D.C. metropolitan area for the rest of his life where he dedicated his time to the practice of calligraphy, acupuncture and giving interviews occasionally. He died from pneumonia in the Hospital of Arlington in Virginia close to his 96th birthday, on February 2, 2003. The eulogy at his funeral was read by one of his students, Yong Taek-chung.

References 

1907 births
2003 deaths
South Korean tang soo do practitioners
South Korean male karateka
Martial arts school founders
People from Seoul
20th-century philanthropists
Shotokan practitioners